Saim Bülend Ulusu (1923 – 23 December 2015) was a Turkish admiral who was Prime Minister of Turkey from the time of the 1980 military coup to the time that elections were allowed in 1983.

Biography
Ulusu graduated from the Turkish Naval Academy on 15 October 1940 with the rank of a Sub-Lieutenant.

He attained the highest possible rank as admiral in 1974, and retired from the military in 1980 as the Commander of the Navy, he was appointed in 1977. As a prime minister he advocated for a closer relationship between Turkey and NATO as well as the member states of the Council of Europe. 

Ulusu died on 23 December 2015, aged 92.

Political career
After 1980 coup d'état, Ulusu was named as Prime Minister of Turkey by military authorities. His cabinet remained in office until the 1983 elections.

References

External links
 Biyografi.net - Biography of Bülend Ulusu 

1923 births
2015 deaths
20th-century prime ministers of Turkey
People from Üsküdar
Naval Academy (Turkey) alumni
Commanders of the Turkish Naval Forces
Prime Ministers of Turkey
Deputies of Istanbul
Members of the 44th government of Turkey